Mina Boyok Jafarzadeh  (best known as Mina Jafarzadeh; born 1946 in Khoy)  is an Iranian television and cinema actress. She started her acting career in 1988 and made her film debut, Fil dar Tariki on same year. She married Bahman Zarrinpour, an Iranian director.

Selected filmography
 Ekhrajiha
 Dear Day
 Ferris wheel
 Flying Passion
 Under the City's Skin (TV series)
 The Gun Loaded

References

External links
 
 Mina Jafarzadeh in Soureh Cinema

1946 births
Living people
People from Khoy
Iranian film actresses
Iranian television actresses
20th-century Iranian actresses